Diggers and Dreamers: The Guide to Communal Living is a primary resource for information, issues, and ideas about intentional communities in England, Scotland, Wales and Northern Ireland – from urban co-ops to cohousing groups to rural communes and low impact developments.

History
Diggers and Dreamers was first published in 1989 as a resource for information, issues, and ideas about intentional communities and communal living in the UK. The project was an offshoot of the Communes Network, a loose organisation that was established at a meeting on 15–16 February 1975 organised by the Communes Movement, which itself was started in 1968 by Selene Community, and which had achieved a distribution of 3000 copies of its journal, Communes: Journal of the Communes Movement, in March 1971.

The bi-annual journal (and from 1999 accompanying website) focusses on all aspects of communal living, with articles covering practical "how-to-do-it" issues of community living as well as personal stories about forming new communities, decision-making, conflict resolution, raising children in community, and sustainability. Through the years there have been contributions from academics and writers studying communal living. Alongside the journal there has been a directory of communal groups.

The book, now in its 10th edition, has been variously described as "the communards bible", "...a fascinating insight into the world of communal living in Britain", and an "exciting combination of journal and service publication".

Publisher
Diggers and Dreamers, available both in print and online, is published by Diggers & Dreamers Publications, which also publishes Utopia Britannica and Thinking About Cohousing. Editorial decisions are made by a small collective made up of around 4 or 5 members drawn from different communities around the UK who describe themselves as a "self-appointed-headless-elite-anarchist-editorial-collective with no office, elastic editorial policies, concertina finances and a can-do/why-not attitude problem."

Themes
Over the years the publication has covered a wide variety of topics connected with communal living and has featured articles by both those living communally and those studying it. The themes covered by articles include:

Decision-making
Manual labour
Childcare
A day in the life
Income pooling
Developmental communalism
Sustainable communal living around the globe
Developing cohousing in the UK
Why Feminism needs Utopianism
The value of art in community
Research and development for Utopia

See also
Fellowship for Intentional Community
Communities Directory

References

External links
Diggers & Dreamers

Intentional communities in the United Kingdom
Magazines established in 1989
Lifestyle magazines published in the United Kingdom
Internet properties established in 1999
Simple living
Biannual magazines published in the United Kingdom
1989 establishments in the United Kingdom